Sanjiv Jaiswal is an Indian film director and producer who mainly works in Hindi films.

Biography
Sanjiv Jaiswal is from Lucknow, Uttar Pradesh. He wanted to become a filmmaker since childhood. After completing his graduation, he came to Mumbai and established his own film production house. He produced his first film, Fareb, in 2005. His second film Anwar (2007) was written and directed by Manish Jha. His debut as a writer and director was in 2012, with Shudra: The Rising, which portrays slavery, untouchability and the caste system in Indian society. Jaiswal was awarded the Best Director's Award for Shudra: The Rising in Dada Saheb Phalke Film Festival in 2013. The film was also nominated for the Boston International Film Festival (2013),

In 2019, Jaiswal wrote and directed the Hindi feature film Pranaam.

Filming for Jaiswal's sequel to Shudra: The Rising, called Bagawat, began in 2020.

Filmography

Webseries

References

External links
 
  Rising/articleshow/16799306.cms Saffron brigade demands ban on movie 'Shudra-The Rising'
 कम बजट में बड़ा संदेश देती 'शूद्र – द राइज़िन्ग'
 Shudra– The Risingreflects one of the major ills of the age-old Indian caste system

Hindi-language film directors
Living people
1972 births